Dammarenediol II synthase (dammarenediol synthase, 2,3-oxidosqualene (20S)-dammarenediol cyclase, DDS, (S)-squalene-2,3-epoxide hydro-lyase (dammarenediol-II forming)) is an enzyme with systematic name (3S)-2,3-epoxy-2,3-dihydrosqualene hydro-lyase (dammarenediol-II forming). This enzyme catalyses the following chemical reaction

 dammarenediol II  (3S)-2,3-epoxy-2,3-dihydrosqualene + H2O

The reaction occurs in the reverse direction.

References

External links 
 

EC 4.2.1